The Tehran Eight was a political union of Shi'a Afghan Mujahideen, mainly of the Hazara ethnic group, during the Soviet–Afghan War. They were supported by Iran, hence the name Tehran Eight.

The Tehran Eight were predominantly active in the Hazarajat region of central Afghanistan, and fought against the PDPA government and the supporting Soviet troops. It formed the second largest resistance force in the war, after the main Afghan mujahideen (also called the "Peshawar Seven"), which was a Sunni alliance.

The Tehran Eight was formed in December 1987 with the direct participation of the Iranian state, after years of inter-factional struggle in the Hazarajat. In 1989, they were united into one party, Hezb-e Wahdat, with the exception of Hezbollah Afghanistan.

The eight factions
The following Afghan organizations composed the Tehran Eight, all headquartered in Iran:
 Hezbollah Afghanistan – led by Qari Ahmad Ali Ghordarwazi
  Sazman-i Nasr (also known as Islamic Victory Organization of Afghanistan) – led by Muhammad Hussein Sadiqi, Abdul Ali Mazari and Shaykh Shafak.
  Corps of Islamic Revolution Guardians of Afghanistan – led by Sheikh Akbari, Mohsen Rezai and Sapahe Pasdaran.
 The Islamic Movement of Afghanistan movement – led by Muhammad Asif Muhsini and Shaykh Sadeq Hashemi. IMOA, a member of the Tehran Eight, joined the Hezb-e Wahdat, which was intended as a united Shiite political front, but soon bolted out of it.
 Revolutionary Council of Islamic Unity of Afghanistan, also known as Shura party – led by Sayeed Ali Beheshti and Sayeed Djagran.
 Islamic Revolution Movement – led by Nasrullah Mansur.
 Union of Islamic Fighters – led by Mosbah Sade, a Hazara leader of Bamian.
 Raad ("Thunder") party – led by Shaykh Sayeed Abdul Jaffar Nadiri, Muhammad Hazai Sayeed Ismail Balkhee.

See also 

Hazaras
Liwa Fatemiyoun
Shia clergy

References

 
Anti-communist organizations
Anti-Soviet factions in the Soviet–Afghan War
Shia Islamist groups